Brayton may refer to:

People
Brayton (name)
 Sir Wilfrid Lawson, 1st Baronet, of Brayton 
 Sir Wilfrid Lawson, 2nd Baronet, of Brayton
 Sir Wilfrid Lawson, 3rd Baronet, of Brayton
 Sir Hilton Lawson, 4th Baronet

Church
Brayton Church Ahlone, Yangon, Myanmar

Places
 Brayton, Iowa, a city in the United States
 Brayton, Nebraska
 Brayton, New South Wales, a small village in Australia
Brayton Hall, Cumbria, England
Brayton railway station, Cumbria, England
 Brayton, North Yorkshire, a small village in England
 Brayton Academy, formerly Brayton High School, a high school in Selby, North Yorkshire, England
 Brayton Grist Mill, an historic grist mill in Pomfret, Connecticut
 Brayton Fire Training Field, a firefighter training field in College Station, Texas
 Brayton Methodist Episcopal Church, an historic church in Fall River, Massachusetts
 32571 Brayton, a Main-belt Asteroid and named after Scott Brayton
 Bailey-Brayton Field, a college baseball stadium in Pullman, Washington, United States

Other 
 Brayton cycle, a thermodynamic cycle
 Justice Brayton (disambiguation)